X-Press 2 are an English electronic dance music duo. The members are DJ Diesel (Darren House) and DJ Rocky (Darren Rock). Ashley Beedle left to pursue solo projects in 2009.  They were DJ Award winners in 2002 and Ivor Novello winners in 2003.

History
Explaining the band's name, Darren Rock (aka 'DJ Rocky') explained that acid house legend Terry Farley of Fire Island came up with it. Rocky said, "We were originally going to call ourselves Rock 2 House, but [Farley] wasn't really into that. So he renamed us X-Press 2. He basically liked the S'Express so kind of adapted that."

X-Press 2 first rose to underground prominence through the tracks "Muzik Express" and "London Xpress"  which were both released on Junior Boys Own Records. X-Press 2 also gained plaudits on the club scene for regularly playing in clubs with their multi-decked (up to six decks with three DJs) sets.

Their debut US single, "The Sound" peaked at number one on the Hot Dance Music/Club Play chart in 1996. 2001 saw the release of their album Muzikizum which contained two more US dance chart entries: "Smoke Machine" (number 31) and "Lazy", which peaked at number one in 2002 and also peaked at number two on the UK Singles Chart in the duo's native United Kingdom, as well as winning them the prestigious Ivor Novello award in 2003.
The lead vocals on "Lazy" are sung by David Byrne (formerly of Talking Heads), and on "I Want You Back" by Dieter Meier of Yello.

Makeshift Feelgood appeared in 2006, featuring Tim DeLaughter, Kurt Wagner, Anthony Roman from Radio 4, Kissing the Pink and Rob Harvey.

In 2013 the "Kill 100 (Carl Craig re-mix)"  was used by Raf Simons for his debut Spring/Summer 2013 show  in his role as creative director for Dior.

X-Press 2 are currently signed to Skint Records, a BMG company.

Discography

Albums
Late Night Sessions II (1997)
Muzikizum (2002) - UK No. 15
Makeshift Feelgood (2006)
 The House of X-Press 2 (2012)
 MMXV (2015)

Compilation albums
Remixes (2002)
Raise Your Hands – The Greatest Hits (2008)
Coast 2 Coast (2008)

Singles

See also
List of number-one dance hits (United States)
List of artists who reached number one on the US Dance chart

References

External links

X-Press 2 on Resident Advisor

English house music duos
English dance music groups
Electronic dance music duos
Remixers